Penni Ann Peppas (born July 2, 1972) is an American former professional basketball player. She was the first foreign born professional player in the Icelandic Úrvalsdeild kvenna, where she won multiple national championships and scoring titles.

College
Peppas played for University of the Ozarks from 1990 to 1994 and left as the schools allt time leader in total points (2170).

Iceland
After graduating in 1994, Peppas signed with Breiðablik in Iceland, becoming the first foreign born professional player in the Icelandic Úrvalsdeild kvenna. She was a three time scoring champion in the Úrvalsdeild and led the league in assists in 1997. Peppas won the Icelandic championship twice, in 1995 with Breiðablik, while also being named as Playoffs MVP, and in 1997 with Grindavík. On October 15, 1996, Peppas had a Quadruple-double against ÍR. For the game she had 52 points, 16 rebounds, 11 assists and 10 rebounds.

Honours
Úrvalsdeild Women's Playoffs MVP (1995)
2x Icelandic champion (1995, 1997)
Icelandic Basketball Supercup (1997)
3x Úrvalsdeild scoring champion (1995-1997)
Úrvalsdeild assists leader (1997)
University of the Ozarks Sports Hall of Fame (2002)
NAIA All-America (1991-92, 1992-93, 1993-94)
Kodak All-American (1992-93)

Úrvalsdeild statistics

Regular season statistics

{| class="wikitable sortable" style="font-size:95%; text-align:right;"
! Year
! Team
! 
! 
! 
! 
! 
! 
! 
! 
! 
|-
| style="text-align:left;background:#afe6ba;"| 1994–95†
| style="text-align:left;"| Breiðablik
| 23 || .550 || .309 || .824 || 8.7 || 3.5 || 4.5 || 0.9 || bgcolor="CFECEC" |25.7*
|-
| style="text-align:left;"| 1995–96
| style="text-align:left;"| Grindavík
| 18 || .606 || .304 || .807 || 8.6 || 3.4 || 4.4 || 0.8 || bgcolor="CFECEC" |28.9*
|-
| style="text-align:left;background:#afe6ba;"| 1996–97†
| style="text-align:left;"| Grindavík
| 17 || .571 || .297 || bgcolor="CFECEC" |.775* || 9.3 || bgcolor="CFECEC" |4.6* || 4.7 || 0.6 || bgcolor="CFECEC" |25.0*
|-
| style="text-align:left;"| 1997–98
| style="text-align:left;"| Grindavík
| 14 || .420 || .286 || bgcolor="CFECEC" |.900* || 6.2 || 3.9 || 2.9 || 0.8 || 13.4 
|- class="sortbottom"
|style="text-align:center;" colspan="2"|Career
|72||.556||.294||.814||8.3||3.8||4.2||0.8||23.9
|- class="sortbottom"

Playoffs statistics
{| class="wikitable sortable" style="font-size:95%; text-align:right;"
! Year
! Team
! 
! 
! 
! 
! 
! 
! 
! 
! 
|-
| style="text-align:left;background:#afe6ba;"| 1995†
| style="text-align:left;"| Breiðablik
| 6 || .512 || .393 || .793 || 9.7 || 3.5 || 3.5 || 1.7 || 23.7
|-
| style="text-align:left;"| 1996
| style="text-align:left;"| Grindavík
| 2 || .605 || .000 || .818 || 7.5 || 1.5 || 6.0 || 1.5 || 27.5
|-
| style="text-align:left;background:#afe6ba;"| 1997†
| style="text-align:left;"| Grindavík
| 5 || .544 || .398 || .840 || 8.8 || 3.2 || 2.5 || 1.4 || 20.8
|-
| style="text-align:left;"| 1998
| style="text-align:left;"| Grindavík
| 2 || .455 || .222 || .900 || 5.5 || 3.0 || 2.0 || 0.5 || 17.5
|- class="sortbottom"
|style="text-align:center;" colspan="2"|Career
|15 || .532 || .323 || .823 || 8.5 || 3.0 || 3.3 || 1.4 || 22.4
|- class="sortbottom"

Source

References

1972 births
Living people
American expatriate basketball people in Iceland
Breiðablik women's basketball players
Grindavík women's basketball players
Point guards
Úrvalsdeild kvenna basketball players